Newburn Bridge is a road bridge crossing the River Tyne at Newburn in Newcastle upon Tyne, England. It links Newburn, Walbottle and Throckley on the north side of the river with Ryton, Stella and Blaydon on the south side. The bridge is the westernmost crossing of the Tyne in the county of Tyne and Wear; the next crossing upstream, Wylam Bridge, is in Northumberland.

History 
This part of the river has been forded since Roman times because it is the most eastern part of the Tyne that is easily fordable. There have also been numerous ferries operated in the part of the river around Newburn. A bridge was finally built between 1892 and 1893. It was designed by Sandeman & Moncrieff of Newcastle and built by Head Wrightson of Thornaby-on-Tees. It was opened on 21 May 1893. For the first 50 or so years of its use, it was a toll bridge, until it was bought by Northumberland County Council in 1947. The toll house on the northeast side of the bridge has since been demolished. The bridge used to have two lanes crossing it up until the 1960s.

In 2007 the bridge was closed for a number of months for renovation and repainting.

In 2018, the bridge was closed to vehicles for several months. It reopened in September 2018.

References 

 
 Newburn Bridge at Bridges on the Tyne

Crossings of the River Tyne
Bridges in Tyne and Wear
Former toll bridges in England